Gurwinder Singh (born 16 April 1986) is an Indian footballer who plays as a defender.

Career
Gurwinder started his senior career with JCT in 2005 after passing out from their youth academy, where he spent a year. Gurwinder left JCT to join East Bengal in 2010. Gurwinder was loaned out to Kerala Blasters FC for the 2014 Indian Super League and was a regular for the Kerala-based team, making 11 appearances including the final match of the competition. Gurwinder is currently represented by UK based Football Agency - Inventive Sports.

He was signed by Northeast United FC for 2018-19 season. He was fondly called as 'Gurwinder Paaji' by his teammates.

International
After a great season with East Bengal, Singh was called up to the India national football team preparatory camp in June 2011 but didn't make any appearances. He made his India debut in 2013, and has gone on to make 10 appearances for the national team. However, he has fallen out of favor since 2015 and hasn't made an appearance since.

Honours

East Bengal
 I-League (runners): 2010-11, 2011-12, 2013-14
 Federation Cup (winner): 2010, 2012
 Calcutta Football League (winner): 2010, 2011, 2012, 2013, 2014, 2015, 2016, 2017
 IFA Shield (winner): 2012
 Super Cup (winner): 2011
 Mohammedan Sporting Platinum Jubilee Cup (winner): 2010

India
 Nehru Cup: 2012

Individual
 NorthEast United FC Defender of the Season: 2018-19

References

External links 
 Player profile at Goal.com
 Player profile at IndianFootball.com
 

Indian footballers
1986 births
Living people
Footballers from Jalandhar
East Bengal Club players
I-League players
Kerala Blasters FC players
Indian Super League players
Association football central defenders
Kerala Blasters FC draft picks